DZRJ-DTV (digital UHF and virtual channel 29) is an independent digital television station licensed to Makati City, Metro Manila, Philippines. The station is the flagship TV property of Rajah Broadcasting Network, Inc., a broadcast company owned by long-time guitarist/musician Ramon "RJ" Jacinto, The station's broadcast facilities are located at the Ventures I Bldg., Makati Ave. cor. Gen. Luna St., Makati; and its digital TV transmitter is situated at Merano Street, Brgy. San Roque, Antipolo City, Rizal Province, It operates from 5:00 AM to 1:00 AM daily.

DZRJ-DTV began in 1993 as DZRJ-TV which operated on UHF Channel 29 using the analog NTSC-M system from 1993 to 2018. The RJ DigiTV network operates 24 hours daily on DTTV, on cable and satellite TV.

Background

First years (1993–2008)
Ramon "RJ" Jacinto's TV property began its test broadcast in April 1993 through UHF TV channel 29 using the Analog NTSC-M system. The station then launched a month later as RJTV (Ramon Jacinto TeleVision), an independent television channel focusing on music oriented shows, local news, talk shows, and the very first local Home TV Shopping program.

On July 3, 1995, RJTV went into niche programming and timeless television series, shopping and animation programs for children. At the time, the target market was kids during the day, and baby boomers at night. RJTV became the strongest UHF TV station in the Philippines, broadcasting with the maximum effective radiated power of 700 kW. In 1997, due to the emergence of UHF competitors such as Studio 23, Citynet 27 and CTV-31, RJTV went from traditional TV programming to specialized programs such as direct response companies and religious sectors. RJTV recognized the advent of specialized television – niche markets that identify specific needs of certain sectors.

In 2003, RJTV experimented with its new programming approach, as it simulcasted its sister FM station RJ 100, which started its new trend called the 'TeleRadyo' concept through RJ's own program RJ Online (now known as RJ Sunday Jam; though it remains to air up to this day). It also became one of the channels who tried to conceptualize its interactive television approach, as it became a text-oriented interactive channel, first airing music videos, combined with the power of SMS messaging. Eventually, it aired programs simulcasted over RBN's radio station DZRJ AM during mornings, shopping programs during afternoons (at that time when RJTV signed-off during afternoons on free TV) and live entertainment programming during primetime, thus, the station adopted its slogan "Interactive TV Station". RJTV also aired programs, which aimed to direct its market approach at consumers; thus, its slogan was "Consumer Television."

Affiliation with Solar Entertainment (2008–2018)
On January 1, 2008, Solar Entertainment Corporation approached RJTV to blocktime one of the former's television channels to the latter. Months prior to the deal, SkyCable stated that they would offer less "redundant" programming and feature more series that had never been aired in the country before, but reports surfaced that channels operated by Solar were pulled due to a carriage dispute; SkyCable's owner, ABS-CBN Corporation, believed that Solar's lower fees for advertising on its channels were causing ABS-CBN to lose revenue. The new blocktime deal between RJTV, Radio Philippines Network, Southern Broadcasting Network, and Solar is said to be a part of the latter's retaliation to Sky. As a result, DZRJ-TV became a network-affiliated station for the first time in its history. The blocktime deal integrated Solar's 2nd Avenue to RJTV's programming. The said deal, however, closed down the station's Venture I broadcast facility and initially transferred its master control to Solar Entertainment's downlink facility in Antipolo prior to another transfer in 2012 to Solar's current playout facilities at Worldwide Corporate Center in Mandaluyong.

On September 9, 2012, the station temporarily ceased broadcasting together with DWVN-TV 45. It was found out that the channel 45 facility was struck by a lightning bolt, and had to shut off both station's transmitters for repair and inspection. The station returned on-air in the morning of November 21.

In 2015, DZRJ-TV's former in-house transmitter had finally pulled the plug and began leasing transmission from the Solar-owned transmitter tower also within Antipolo, sharing transmission with Solar's subsidiary, Southern Broadcasting Network. Solar provided the upgrade to provide a clearer and better signal reception for SBN and RJTV in both analog and digital signals.

Return to independent broadcasting (2018–present) 
In May 2018, Solar Entertainment launched its own premium digital terrestrial TV service Easy TV. When the service promoted ETC and most of Solar's operated and distributed channels, 2nd Avenue was not included into the lineup. Solar and RJTV later announced their plans for the channel: 2nd Avenue would end all regularly scheduled programming (coinciding the mid-season break of US Television's primetime programming) and terrestrial transmission by June 5, while provincial cable and satellite providers would be provided with a lifeline service until June 30 featuring marathons of the channel's former inventory; after June 5, RJTV's affiliation deal with Solar would expire and would return to independence.

The new RJTV, now known as RJ DigiTV began airing at 12 midnight of June 5, with TV Shop Philippines as its first program to air during the test broadcast, followed by re-run of some of the local programs from RJTV's vast video library, including Pinoy Wrestling, classic programs aired on the station and RJ's concert specials. RJAM and RJFM's programs were also aired on the new channel. During its initial run, RJDigiTV operated 24/7.

Originally scheduled in July 2018, RJTV relaunched on January 3, 2019, with the first 2 subchannels, the main RJTV channel and Oras ng Himala channel, and later, the TeleRadyo channels of their sister radio stations DZRJ-AM and DZRJ-FM. It became the 2nd television station in the Philippines to end its analog transmission and went full-blown on its digital television broadcasts, using the ISDB-T digital TV system (more than a year after Light TV 33, though it still beams on analog through its provincial UHF stations) in 2021.

Current programming

Digital television

Digital channels

DZRJ-TV operates on UHF Channel 29 (563.143 MHz), and is multiplexed thru the following subchannels:

Oras ng Himala Channel 

Jesus is Our Shield Worldwide Ministries began broadcasting its own religious channel, the Oras ng Himala Channel, in mid-2018. The subchannel features previous archived and new episodes of its eponymous religious show, as well as live religious services of the ministry. Prior to its standalone channel launch, its shows were formerly part of DWKC-TV's blocktime deal, airing its shows in selected time spots of the day. The said religious program aired on state-run People's Television Network until August 31, 2021; and again, last December 14, 2022, where it returned on TV5 every past midnight thrice a week.

RJ Rock TV 

Rajah Broadcasting Network began broadcasting its own 24-hour rock oriented music channel, the RJ Rock TV (formerly Rock of Manila TV), in late-2019 (fifteen years after UNTV Channel 37 (now UNTV News and Rescue) abandoned its rock TV format from 2001 to 2004, eventually becoming the first public service TV station in the country). The subchannel features archived videos of rock-oriented content, as well as concert videos, produced by the now defunct RJ Underground Radio 105.9, which as aired of the main channel, prior to the launch. The channel also plans to air music videos by unsigned independent bands on the channel soon.

TV Maria 

TV Maria is a Filipino Catholic channel, owned by the Catholic Bishops Conference of the Philippines and the Roman Catholic Archdiocese of Manila through TV Maria Philippines Foundation, Inc., and features locally produced Roman Catholic programming from the station's in-house productions, as well as Family Rosary Crusade, Jesuit Communications, Kerygma TV (now Feast TV), Daughters of St. Paul, and other Catholic oriented groups, as well as selected canned programs outsourced from Eternal Word Television Network, alongside live coverage of the Holy Masses and other liturgical celebrations from Quiapo Church, Manila Cathedral, and other Catholic churches (strategically located within the jurisdiction of the Archdiocese of Manila).

Planned subchannels 
The network plans to accommodate six digital channels that will air local & foreign content to the station. Among those channels are TeleRadyo simulcasts of its radio stations DZRJ-AM and DZRJ-FM.

Analog-to-digital transition 
In 2015, Solar Entertainment supplied its DTV channels through the new platform. During its initial test, Solar placed both SBN and RJTV in its DWCP-TV digital signal on channel 22. For unknown reasons, the transmitter's encryption system was activated throughout its run, making two of the station's subchannels receivable only on set-top boxes with this capability. The technical issue was fixed by September 25, 2017.

Around the last quarter of 2017, Solar launched a second test transmission signal (on behalf of RJTV) on channel 30, although it remained sharing transmitter facilities with SBN. However, RJTV announced in May 2018 that the station's analog signal would be shut down after 2nd Avenue programming closed down.

DZRJ-TV shut down its analog signal, over UHF channel 29, at 1:05 am of June 5, 2018. Its subchannels on digital channel 30, including the license, was returned immediately to Solar after the analog shutoff. The shutdown was rumored to be done at midnight of the same day after a short promo of 2nd Avenue's impending closure, but miscommunication on when to pull the plug resulted in the station to be shut off on its regular 1:00 am sign off.

Initially, the station would flash cut its digital signal on July 15, 2018, to the former analog channel; numerous delays in the logistics and installation of their brand-new digital TV transmitter postponed the station's initial transmission until the 1st quarter of 2019. On January 3, 2019, RJTV made a flash cut sequence on its digital signal for post-transition operations, yet technical modifications were made to address audio issues with several integrated TV sets, mobile DTVs, and digital set-top box devices. Currently, DZRJ-DTV started broadcasting digitally with first 3 channels, the main RJTV channel the Oras ng Himala channel, DZRJ RadioVision (now Radyo Bandido TV) and Rock of Manila TV (now RJ Rock TV). The subchannels of TV Shop Philippines and TV Maria have commenced on 2nd Quarter of 2020.

Areas of coverage

Primary areas 
 Metro Manila
 Cavite
 Bulacan
 Laguna
 Rizal

Secondary areas 
 Portion of Pampanga
 Portion of Bataan
 Portion of Tarlac
 Portion of Zambales
 Portion of Nueva Ecija
 Portion of Batangas
 Portion of Quezon

RJTV previous programs

RJTV stations nationwide

See also
 Rajah Broadcasting Network
 DZRJ-AM 810 kHz
 RJFM 100.3

References

External links
 

1993 establishments in the Philippines
Television stations in Metro Manila
2nd Avenue (TV channel) stations
Television channels and stations established in 1993
Digital television stations in the Philippines